Wesołowo may refer to the following places:
Wesołowo, Sokółka County in Podlaskie Voivodeship (north-east Poland)
Wesołowo, Suwałki County in Podlaskie Voivodeship (north-east Poland)
Wesołowo, Szczytno County in Warmian-Masurian Voivodeship (north Poland)
Wesołowo, Węgorzewo County in Warmian-Masurian Voivodeship (north Poland)